Sidaire is a townland in Magheracross civil parish, County Fermanagh, Northern Ireland. It is located in the barony of Tirkennedy, in civil parish of Magheracross.

Geography
Sidaire is 327.37 acres in area, and is bounded by the Ballinamallard River to the south, the town of Ballinamallard to the east and the Enniskillen Road to the west. The topography is generally of pasture on undulating hillsides.

History
Sidaire has a rich history, from sub-Roman, medieval and early modern times.

Gallery

References

Villages in County Fermanagh
Townlands of County Fermanagh